This is a list of seasons completed by the Pepperdine Waves men's college basketball team.

Seasons

 Marty Wilson finished the season as interim coach, going 3–10 and 2–9 in conference. Fuller began the season, going 7–8 and 0–3 in conference.
 Eric Bridgeland finished the season as interim coach, going 5–9 and 4–8 in conference. Walberg began the season, going 6–12 and 0–2 in conference.

Notes

Pepperdine Waves
Pepperdine Waves men's basketball seasons
Pepperdine Waves basketball seasons